Cornutanna is a genus of radiolarians in the order Nassellaria.

References

External links 

 

Polycystines
Radiolarian genera